Henry Núñez (born 5 April 1969) is a Costa Rican judoka. He competed at the 1988 Summer Olympics and the 1996 Summer Olympics.

In 2008, he became the president of the Costa Rican Olympic Committee.

References

1969 births
Living people
Costa Rican male judoka
Olympic judoka of Costa Rica
Judoka at the 1988 Summer Olympics
Judoka at the 1996 Summer Olympics
Place of birth missing (living people)